Brigadier Derek Mills-Roberts,  (23 November 1908 – 1 October 1980) was a British commando who fought with the 1st Special Service Brigade during the Second World War. In a quirk of military history, he became the only Allied soldier to strike a German field marshal with the latter's own staff-of-office – when Mills-Roberts beat Erhard Milch over the head with the just-surrendered marshal's baton.

Early life
Derek Mills-Roberts was born on 23 November 1908 in England. During the 1930s, he trained to become a lawyer at Liverpool College and the University of Oxford. On 3 October 1936, he was commissioned into the Irish Guards Supplementary Reserve of Officers as a second lieutenant, having been an officer cadet of the University of Oxford contingent of the Officer Training Corps. It was at Oxford that Mills-Roberts met his good friend Lord Lovat. Mills-Roberts and Lord Lovat had actually got off on a bad start. They had a rivalry which involved a heated argument and an exchange of blows. From that time on, however, they became close friends. After graduation from Oxford, Mills-Roberts worked for his father's law firm.

Second World War
Mills-Roberts began his military service in the No. 4 Commando Unit. His good friend Lord Lovat was given command of the unit, while Mills-Roberts served as second-in-command. On 3 March 1941, Mills-Roberts, in the No. 4 Commando Unit, launched a raid on the German-occupied Lofoten Islands in Norway. In the successful raid, the commandos destroyed a significant number of fish-oil factories, petrol dumps and 11 ships. They also seized encryption equipment and codebooks. In addition to the destruction of materials, the commandos captured 216 German troops, and 315 Norwegians chose to accompany the commandos back to Britain. In August 1942, Mills-Roberts was involved in the disastrous Dieppe Raid. The raid, a small scale invasion mounted by Canadian infantry and British commandos against Adolf Hitler's Atlantic Wall, was a complete failure and the units involved suffered very heavily. Lovat and Mills-Roberts's involvement in the raid was to secure the opposing flanks of the landing area and to destroy coastal batteries. Mills-Roberts was awarded the Military Cross on 2 October 1942 "in recognition of gallant and distinguished services in the combined attack on Dieppe".

By October 1942, Mills-Roberts was a lieutenant (temporary captain) (acting major). He was shortly after promoted to lieutenant colonel and given command of No. 6 Commando Unit; he was then stationed in North Africa. He was awarded the Distinguished Service Order (DSO) on 22 April 1943 "in recognition of gallant and distinguished services in North Africa". During the Normandy landings in 1944, No. 6 Commando Unit captured the port of Ouistreham and linked up with the 6th Airborne Division on the eastern flank of Sword. Mills-Roberts was awarded a Bar to his DSO on 21 June 1945 "in recognition of gallant and distinguished services in North-West Europe".

Later in the war, Mills-Roberts took part in the Bergen-Belsen concentration camp's liberation. When Luftwaffe field marshal Erhard Milch was captured and surrendered his command baton to Mills-Roberts, the latter vented his anger about the atrocities he had seen at Bergen-Belsen, marching Milch around the camp and demanding to know his thoughts on the terrible sights witnessed. Milch's reply (who spoke English) was along the lines of "these people are not human beings in the same way as you and I!" This infuriated Mills-Roberts, who took Milch's field marshal's baton from under Milch's arm, and then proceeded to brutally strike it over Milch's head until it broke and then repeatedly beat Milch with a champagne bottle. Mills-Roberts went to Field Marshal Bernard Montgomery the following day to apologise for losing his temper with a senior German officer and Montgomery put his hands over his head in mock protection jokingly saying "I hear you've got a thing about Field Marshals", and nothing more was said. This incident left Milch with several contusions and a fractured skull. The broken pieces were retrieved by his batman and the remains were given to Mills-Robert's wife Jill, who had the baton restored at Swayne Adeney Brigg in London, but the replacement shaft was slightly longer than the original. In later years, Jill sold the baton at auction. Before the auction, an injunction was put on the sale by the Milch family, who contested ownership, saying that the baton was 'stolen' from Milch. A local magistrate in the United Kingdom decided that the baton was legitimate war booty and the sale continued; eventually the baton went to an American collector in Florida. By June 1945, Mills-Roberts was a brigadier (temporary).

In the 1950 New Year Honours, Mills-Roberts was appointed a Commander of the Order of the British Empire (CBE).

References

External links
TracesOfWar.com
http://www.pegasusarchive.org/normandy/derek_mills_roberts.htm
Generals of World War II

1908 births
1980 deaths
British Army brigadiers of World War II
British Army Commandos officers
Recipients of the Military Cross
Companions of the Distinguished Service Order
Commanders of the Order of the British Empire
Recipients of the Croix de Guerre 1939–1945 (France)
Recipients of the Legion of Honour
People educated at Liverpool College
Irish Guards officers